Holystone is a village in North Tyneside, Tyne and Wear, England. It is situated to the southwest of Whitley Bay, just off the A19.

There is one school located within the village, Holystone Primary School.

There is also a Premier Inn.

References

Villages in Tyne and Wear
Metropolitan Borough of North Tyneside